Hugo Guimarães Silva Santos Almeida (born 6 January 1986), sometimes known as just Hugo, is a Brazilian footballer who plays as a forward for Barra.

Career
Born in São Fidélis, Rio de Janeiro, Hugo Almeida was a Botafogo youth graduate, making his first team debuts in 2004. He left the club in 2005, aged only 19, and joined fellow league team Coritiba in 2006.

Hugo Almeida eventually fell down in the pecking order at Coxa, and was subsequently loaned to Sertãozinho, São Caetano, Grêmio Prudente and Goiás. He was released by Coritiba after the end of the spell with the latter.

On 19 January 2012 Hugo Almeida joined XV de Piracicaba. On 3 May, he moved to Paraná, but appeared rarely.

Hugo Almeida subsequently appeared for clubs in Japan in the following year, representing Ventforet Kofu, Roasso Kumamoto and Fagiano Okayama (after a short spell back to his homeland at Náutico). On 5 January 2015 he signed for Portuguesa.

Club statistics

Honours
Brazil
 FIFA U-17 World Cup: 2003

Coritiba
Campeonato Brasileiro Série B: 2007
Campeonato Paranaense: 2008

América Mineiro
Campeonato Brasileiro Série B: 2017

Ittihad Tanger
Botola: 2017–18

References

External links

Hugo at Footballdatabase

1986 births
Living people
Sportspeople from Rio de Janeiro (state)
Brazilian footballers
Association football forwards
Campeonato Brasileiro Série A players
Campeonato Brasileiro Série B players
Campeonato Brasileiro Série C players
Campeonato Brasileiro Série D players
J1 League players
J2 League players
Botafogo de Futebol e Regatas players
Coritiba Foot Ball Club players
Sertãozinho Futebol Clube players
Associação Desportiva São Caetano players
Grêmio Barueri Futebol players
Goiás Esporte Clube players
Esporte Clube XV de Novembro (Piracicaba) players
Paraná Clube players
Clube Náutico Capibaribe players
Associação Portuguesa de Desportos players
Ventforet Kofu players
Roasso Kumamoto players
Fagiano Okayama players
Esporte Clube Juventude players
América Futebol Clube (MG) players
Ittihad Tanger players
Paysandu Sport Club players
Joinville Esporte Clube players
Clube Atlético Joseense players
Esporte Clube São Bento players
Esporte Clube Pelotas players
Esporte Clube São Luiz players
Sociedade Esportiva do Gama players
Ypiranga Futebol Clube players
Brazilian expatriate footballers
Brazilian expatriate sportspeople in Japan
Expatriate footballers in Japan